John Alexander Caceres Quintero (born July 5, 1987) is a Colombian footballer who plays for the Tacoma Stars in the Major Arena Soccer League.

Career
On August 2, 2013, Caceres signed a professional contract with NASL club Atlanta Silverbacks.

References

External links
 Silverbacks bio

1987 births
Living people
Colombian footballers
Colombian expatriate footballers
Sevilla FC Puerto Rico players
Fresno Fuego players
Cal FC players
Atlanta Silverbacks players
Association football midfielders
Expatriate soccer players in the United States
USL League Two players
North American Soccer League players
Major Arena Soccer League players
Toros Mexico
Las Vegas Legends
Monterrey Flash players
Ontario Fury players
El Paso Coyotes players
Footballers from Medellín
Tacoma Stars (2003–) players